The Lambton Kent District School Board (known as English-language Public District School Board No. 10 prior to 1999) is the school board responsible for public education in Lambton County and Kent County. Lambton and Kent Counties are made up of numerous small towns and communities situated in Southwestern Ontario, a geographic area surrounded by the Great Lakes. The board serves over 21,000 elementary and high school students. Surrounding towns and communities include Wheatley, Tilbury, Merlin, Blenheim, Chatham, Ridgetown, Thamesville, Dresden, Wallaceburg, Bothwell, Mooretown, Corunna, Sarnia, Brigden, Petrolia, Alvinston, Point Edward, Wyoming, Watford, Forest, Grand Bend, and Wyoming.

Board offices 
The LKDSB has two board office locations, one in Chatham, Ontario and one in Sarnia, Ontario, the two biggest cities in the area they serve.

Secondary schools 
The high schools or secondary schools managed by the Board are:

Elementary schools

Adult and Continuing Education 
The Lambton Kent District School Board offers a number of programs for those wanting to continue or complete their education.

Locations:
Sarnia Office: 340 Murphy Road, Sarnia, Ontario

Chatham Office: 92 Churchill Street, Chatham, Ontario

Community Use of Schools 
The Community Use of Schools initiative is a way of making school facilities accessible to the public. Such facilities include classrooms, gymnasiums, auditoriums, and more. The rental fees can range from as little as $1.50 a night to as much as $125.00 per night, plus applicable staff. Quite often the staff will include janitors (if outside their regularly scheduled hours), but in some cases may included specialized staff for auditorium rentals. These staff are often specially trained students, but sometimes are outside professionals brought in by the host school to accommodate the renter's needs. Seminars, corporate events, dance recitals, and community theatre groups are the most common renters of the auditorium, whereas local sports tournaments are the most common renters of the gymnasiums.

Presentations that have occurred in these facilities include a presentation from Chris Hadfield, and amateur productions of musicals such as Les Misérables, Disney's Beauty and the Beast, Willy Wonka, Phantom of the Opera, and more.

Social media 
The Lambton Kent District School Board operates two social media accounts, one on Twitter  and the other on Facebook.

See also
St. Clair Catholic District School Board
List of school districts in Ontario
List of high schools in Ontario

References

External links

School districts in Ontario
Education in Chatham-Kent
Education in Lambton County
Education in Sarnia